RingBack Tone Advertising, or RBT-Ads (also known as RingBack Advertising, Ad RingBack, Ad-RBT, AdRBT, Voice Ads, or Biz-Ring), replaces the Ringback tone period, or standard acoustic signal a caller hears that indicates the called phone is ringing, with advertisements or other promotional messages. 
Wireless carriers, calling cards, infrastructure vendors, ad networks, media agencies and free information services offer RBT-Ad space to advertisers, brands and agencies, making it possible for mobile service providers to monetize this inventory of ad space and in turn offer free or very inexpensive wireless services to consumers and subscribers.

Two Kinds of RBT-Ads Available 

a)	Interactive Reverse RingBack Tone Advertisement (IRRBT-Ad) specifically targets the subscriber.
b)	Interactive RingBack Tone Advertisement (IRBT-Ad) specifically targets the person calling a subscriber.

RingBack Tone Advertisement can be booked via direct negotiation with the carrier or firms offering the services and/or online with booking interfaces that are similar to Google AdWords.

Examples of firms using RingBack Tone Advertising include but not limited to: 
Coca-Cola, Unilever, Procter & Gamble, Nestle, Warner Bros., Burger King, Nivea, Kraft, HSBC, Aviva, China Airlines, Taiwan Sports Lottery, TKK Fried Chicken, HOLA, Nokia, Yakult, Marvel, King Games, Air Asia, Cadbury, Nissan, Datsun, HP, Canon, Hitachi, Whirlpool, Nerolac.

List of Online Booking Interfaces (alphabetical order)

List of Carriers Offering RingBack Tone Advertisement (alphabetical order)

Advertisement Genre 

RingBack Tone advertisement is categorized as in-call media (Keller, September 2009) or in-call advertisement (Qiao, 2009; Brian, 2009). According to the Mobile Marketing Association (MMA), which released the first guidelines regulating RingBack Tone Advertisement, it is a subcategory belonging to mobile marketing.
RingBack Tone advertising is being described as a new type of advertising that competes with long-standing advertising media such as TV, radio, newspaper, and the Internet. It has been reported that in the United States, consumers rate RingBack Tone advertisements as the second most acceptable form of advertising they would allow on their mobile device.

History 

The development of RingBack Tone Advertisement started with patent filings in 2000 by Jonathan Streitzel and is still ongoing. Based on Seelig's patent filings and publishing in the Economist Magazine in August 2001, the first functional prototype for RingBack Tone Advertisement was developed by Karl Seelig in 2001. Commercial use of RBT advertisement started around 2008 with mobile carriers Turkcell, RingPlus, Orange's Yesss! and Peter Zahlts. Since 2012, RingPlus was, and still is, the first U.S. wireless carrier offering free and low cost cellphone plans subsidised by RingBack Tone Advertisement.
Endorsed Ad-RBT service is currently offered to telecoms in Europe under partnerships between mobile advertising firm Xipto and RBT provider Muzicall and by Xipto working directly with some operators and Music RBT providers.
RingBack Tone Advertising platforms are currently offered to major telecom operators by a small number of suppliers, including OnMobile and RingPlus, Ericsson.
In March 2010, the Mobile Marketing Association published a white paper authored by Xipto, RingCo, Comverse, LiveWire Mobile, and 4Play Digital Media on RingBack Tone Advertising that outlines preliminary best practices for Ad-RBTs (as described by Ad-RBT service providers) and discusses the various business models and acceptable content guidelines as endorsed by the MMA.

Effectiveness of RingBack Tone Advertisement 

Clickthrough rates of Interactive Reverse RingBack Tones are reported at an average of 2.5% with a wide variance from 0% up to 7.5%, depending on the offering of the advertisement itself.
In 2009, Nielsen Mobile estimated that an average U.S. mobile subscriber receives about 4 calls per day, which places the total inbound call volume of 3 billion global mobile subscribers at approximately 12 billion inbound calls per day, a figure that has remained more or less steady for the past few years. Based on the total inbound call volume, the global opportunity for Ad‐RBTs is immense. For example, if just twelve million mobile subscribers used Ad‐RBTs to advertise a favorite product or organization, RingBack Tone advertising would be delivering approximately 48 million paid advertisements per day, a figure slightly higher than Google’s pay‐per‐click search advertising interactions per day on the web. Furthermore, Ad‐RBTs are a mobile experience that is always shared between users, giving it the potential to expand virally if Ad‐RBT content is engaging, interesting, funny, or relates to brands or causes that people are passionate about. Therefore, it is important that ad content is brief and efficient, exciting and playful, or practical and need‐specific to increase consumer acceptance and interaction and reduce churn rate.

References 

Telecommunication services
Mobile telecommunications
Telecommunications infrastructure